Ruczaj may refer to the following places in Poland:
Ruczaj, Warmian-Masurian Voivodeship
Osiedle Ruczaj, a housing estate in the Dębniki district of Kraków